Postcards from Surfers is a collection of short works by Australian writer Helen Garner published in 1985. The book won the 1986 New South Wales Premier's Literary Awards "Christina Stead Prize for Fiction". The stories in the collection have been described as "largely about miscommunication, impossible love, and the accidental hurt we cause each other when we interact."
Most of the short works in Postcards from Surfers have been included in a 2017 anthology of Garner's short fiction simply called Stories.

References

External links
 Postcards from Surfers: 30 years on - Meanjin blog post, 19 November 2015

Australian short story collections
1985 short story collections